Pedetes primarily refers to Pedetes Illiger, 1811, the genus of the two extant springhare species.

The term has also been proposed for three beetle genera, but is relegated to junior synonym status:
Pedetes Creutzer, 1799, a manuscript name and a synonym of Orchestes, a genus of weevils
Pedetes Kirby, 1837, a synonym of Agriotes, a genus of click beetles
Pedetes Faust, 1894, replaced with Pedetinus Faust, 1895, a genus of Central and South American weevils